Danger Ahead may refer to:
Danger Ahead (1918 film), short starring Helen Gibson
Danger Ahead (1921 film), starring Mary Philbin
Danger Ahead (1923 film), written by Keene Thompson
Danger Ahead (1935 film), American film directed by Albert Herman
Danger Ahead (1940 film), starring Dorothea Kent 
"Danger Ahead", the four-note leitmotif to Dragnet, derived from Miklós Rózsa's score for The Killers
Danger Ahead, a volume consisting of the novels Red Lights and The Watchmaker of Everton by Georges Simenon